Aliceia okutanii is a species of sea snail, a marine gastropod mollusc in the family Raphitomidae.

Description
The length of the shell attains 4.9 mm.

Distribution
This marine species occurs off Japan.

References

 Sasaki, T. & Warén, A. (2007) A new species of Aliceia (Gastropoda: Turridae) from Ogasawara Islands, Japan. Venus, 65, 369–371

okutanii
Gastropods described in 2007